Landore High Level railway station  was opened on 19 June 1850 by the South Wales Railway, which later became part of the Great Western Railway. The station was located on the north side of Swansea in the residential area of Landore. The engineer of this broad gauge line was Brunel. After closure of Landore Low Level in 1954 the station became known as Landore.

To the west of the station site is Landore Junction (Swansea Loop East Junction), which allows trains to run south into the main Swansea terminus.

History 
The station suffered a fire in 1874, which resulted in a rebuild in the following year.

Future
As of 2019 the station is being considered for reopening.

See also
The Landore railway viaduct is a prominent local landmark which was opened with the line and station in 1850. 
Great Western Railway's Landore Depot was used for servicing Inter City 125 passenger trains until its closure in December 2018.
Landore Low Level railway station was nearby, on the Morriston Branch, closed 1954.

References

Disused railway stations in Swansea
Former Great Western Railway stations
Railway stations in Great Britain opened in 1850
Railway stations in Great Britain closed in 1964
Beeching closures in Wales
1850 establishments in Wales